The Lifan X70 is a compact SUV produced by the Chinese manufacturer Lifan Motors, division of Lifan Group.

History
The vehicle was presented at the Lifan Global Dealers' Conference on 21 September 2017 in Lijiang and has been sold since spring 2018, first in Russia. Later, the vehicle was offered in China and South America.

At Auto Shanghai in April 2015, Lifan showed the X70 concept car.

References

Mid-size sport utility vehicles
X70
Cars introduced in 2018
2010s cars